Hymenobacter coalescens  is a Gram-negative, aerobic, rod-shaped and non-motile bacterium from the genus of Hymenobacter which has been isolated from water from the Woopo wetland.

References

External links
Type strain of Hymenobacter coalescens at BacDive -  the Bacterial Diversity Metadatabase

coalescens
Bacteria described in 2016